Jovan Campbell (born November 13, 1990), better known by his stage name Jibbs, is an American rapper. He had one top ten single on the Billboard Hot 100, which was his debut single "Chain Hang Low". Jibbs's only other song that charted on the Billboard Hot 100 was "King Kong" (featuring Chamillionaire).

Biography
Jibbs was born in St. Louis, Missouri. He began rapping at a young age in order to impress his older brother DJ Beatz who, at this time, gained notoriety thanks to his collaboration with rappers Nelly and Chingy.

Jibbs subsequently signed with Geffen Records and released his debut album Jibbs feat. Jibbs on October 24, 2006. His debut single from the album, "Chain Hang Low", became the most downloaded rap song in August 2006.

In 2007, after filming the music video for "Smile", he took part in the Price of Fame tour with Bow Wow and Lloyd.

In June 2012, Jibbs released a free album titled Back 2 The American Dream.

Discography

Studio albums

Mixtapes
 Round One (2009; hosted by DJ Twin)
 Round Two (2011; hosted by DJ Twin & DJ 1Hunnit)

Singles

References

External links

1990 births
American male rappers
Living people
Rappers from St. Louis
21st-century American rappers
21st-century American male musicians
Pop rappers